Bilaspur is a town and tehsil in Rampur district, Uttar Pradesh. India on the bank of Bhakra river. It is situated on the Nainital road  from Rampur on NH-87 and 15 km from Rudrapur. 30% of the population is Muslim, 20% are Gangwar, Lodhi, 20% are Sikhs and the remaining 30% is Kayastha, Khatri, Jatav, and Bania and other castes. The main source of income is farming and Business, although new industries are coming. The major crops are rice, wheat, pea, sugarcane and vegetables. Mango, guava and papaya are grown here.

Geography
It has an average elevation of 144 metres (472 feet).

Demographics
As of the 2001 Census of India, Bilaspur had a population of 35,729. Males constitute 53% of the population and females 47%.

Languages
While Hindi and Urdu are respectively the official and second official languages of the state of Uttar Pradesh, Punjabi is spoken by 47% of the population of Bilaspur.

Administration
Bilaspur Municipal Board

This body is responsible for administration of Bilaspur Town area. Present Chairman of Municipal Board is mohd. Hassan khan while charge of Executive officer is with SDM Mayank Goswami P.C.S .

Assembly Representative & District Magistrate

The present MLA and SDM of Bilaspur is Shri Baldev Singh Aulakh and Shri Mayank Goswami P.C.S respectively.

Education 
Bilaspur has one engineering college, Apex Institute of Technology and one Nursing college, PSM nursing college. Apart from that Bilaspur has one Govt PG College and 4 Govt Inter colleges.

References

Cities and towns in Rampur district